The Copa do Brasil 1990 was the 2nd staging of the Copa do Brasil.

The competition started on June 19, 1990, and concluded on November 7, 1990, with the second leg of the final, held at the Estádio Serra Dourada in Goiânia, in which Flamengo lifted the trophy for the first time with a 0-0 draw with Goiás.

Bizu, of Náutico, with seven goals, was the competition's topscorer.

Format
The competition was disputed by 32 clubs in a knock-out format where all rounds were played in two legs and the away goals rule was used.

Participating teams

Competition stages

Finals

References
 Copa do Brasil 1990 at RSSSF

1990
1990 in Brazilian football
1990 domestic association football cups